Interbau was a housing development, constructed as part of the 1957 International Building Exhibition in the Hansaviertel area of West Berlin. The overall plan was managed by Otto Bartning, and the urban design competition was won by Gerhard Jobst and Willy Kreuer, whose plans were later executed in a modified form.

Working within constraints of size, layout and cost, forty-eight architects designed a huge range of accommodation, both low- and high-rise, with many permutations in plan.

Architects 

Contributing architects included:

Alvar Aalto
Jacob Bakema
Paul Baumgarten
Luciano Baldessari
Le Corbusier
Werner Düttmann
Wils Ebert
Egon Eiermann
Walter Gropius
Arne Jacobsen
Fritz Jaenicke and Sten Samuelson
Gustav Hassenpflug
Günter Hönow
Ludwig Lemmer
Wassili Luckhardt
Oscar Niemeyer
Godber Nissen
Sep Ruf
Otto Senn
Hans Scharoun
Franz Schuster
Hugh Stubbins
Max Taut
Pierre Vago
Jo van den Broek

Gallery

See also
International Building Exhibition Berlin, also known as IBA Berlin 1983/87

References

External links

Official website of the BIE

Residential buildings completed in 1957
Buildings and structures in Berlin
Housing in Germany